Okhotsky (masculine), Okhotskaya (feminine), or Okhotskoye (neuter) may refer to:
Okhotsky District, a district of Khabarovsk Krai, Russia
Okhotsk Plate (Okhotskaya plita), a tectonic plate
Sea of Okhotsk (Okhotskoye more), a sea in the western Pacific Ocean

See also
Okhotsk (disambiguation)